is a railway station located in the city of Izunokuni, Shizuoka Prefecture, Japan operated by the private railroad company Izuhakone Railway.

Lines
Takyō Station is served by the Sunzu Line, and is located 14.2 kilometers from the starting point of the line at Mishima Station.

Station layout
The station has an island platform and a side platform connected to the station building by a level crossing. The station building has both a staffed service counter and automatic ticket machines.

Platforms

History 
Takyō Station was opened on July 17, 1899 as part of the extension of the Sunzu line from Nanjō Station (present-day Izu-Nagaoka) to Ōhito.

Passenger statistics
In fiscal 2017, the station was used by an average of 1292 passengers daily (boarding passengers only).

Surrounding area
 former Ohito Town Hall
Kano River

See also
 List of Railway Stations in Japan

References

External links

 Official home page

Railway stations in Japan opened in 1899
Railway stations in Shizuoka Prefecture
Izuhakone Sunzu Line
Izunokuni